The men's 69 kilograms weightlifting event was the third lightest men's event at the weightlifting competition, limiting competitors to a maximum of 69 kilograms of body mass. The competition took place between August 11 and 12 and was divided in three parts due to the large number of competitors. Group C weightlifters competed at 12:30 on the 11th, Group B competed at 10:00 on the 12th, and Group A at 19:00. This event was the seventh Weightlifting event to conclude.

Each lifter performed in both the snatch and clean and jerk lifts, with the final score being the sum of the lifter's best result in each. The athlete received three attempts in each of the two lifts; the score for the lift was the heaviest weight successfully lifted.

Schedule
All times are China Standard Time (UTC+08:00)

Records

Results 

 Tigran Martirosyan of Armenia originally won the bronze medal, but he was disqualified in 2016 after a re-analysis of his samples from the 2008 Olympics resulted in a positive test for stanozolol and turinabol.
 Alexandru Dudoglo of Moldova originally finished ninth, but he was disqualified in 2016 after a  re-analysis of his samples from the 2008 Olympics resulted in a positive test for stanozolol.

References 

 Page 2664
Results 

Weightlifting at the 2008 Summer Olympics
Men's events at the 2008 Summer Olympics